Béatrice Farinacci (born 9 September 1964) is a former French figure skater who competed in ladies singles. She is the 1982 French champion.

Results

References

 skatabase

French female single skaters
1964 births
Living people
Place of birth missing (living people)